In statistics and econometrics, set identification (or partial identification) extends the concept of identifiability (or "point identification") in statistical models to situations where the distribution of observable variables is not informative of the exact value of a parameter, but instead constrains the parameter to lie in a strict subset of the parameter space. Statistical models that are set identified arise in a variety of settings in economics, including game theory and the Rubin causal model.

Though the use of set identification dates to a 1934 article by Ragnar Frisch, the methods were significantly developed and promoted by Charles Manski starting in the 1990s. Manski developed a method of worst-case bounds for accounting for selection bias. Unlike methods that make additional statistical assumptions, such as Heckman correction, the worst-case bounds rely only on the data to generate a range of supported parameter values.

Definition 
Let  be a statistical model where the parameter space  is either finite- or infinite-dimensional. Suppose  is the true parameter value.

Example: missing data 
There is a missing data problem, however:  can only be observed if .

By the law of total probability,

Therefore, the identified set is

Given the missing data constraint, the econometrician can only say that . This makes use of all available information.

Statistical inference 
Set estimation cannot rely on the usual tools for statistical inference developed for point estimation. A literature in statistics and econometrics studies methods for statistical inference in the context of set-identified models, focusing on constructing confidence intervals or confidence regions with appropriate properties.

Notes

References

Further reading 
 

Econometric modeling
Estimation theory